Robert Patrick Lalonde (born March 27, 1951) is a Canadian former professional ice hockey player who played 641 games in the National Hockey League from 1971 to 1982. During his career he accumulated 124 goals, 210 assists for a total of 334 points. He played for the Vancouver Canucks, Atlanta Flames, Boston Bruins, and a short stint with the Calgary Flames until his eventual retirement due to a recurring knee injury. Bobby Lalonde was listed at 5'5" and was the shortest player to play in the NHL at that time. He was selected 17th overall in the second round of the 1971 NHL Entry Draft.

He now resides on the outskirts of Toronto, Ontario, with his wife Carolyn. He has two sons. Brent, the eldest, was born while he was playing for the Vancouver Canucks and his younger son Court was born while he was playing for the Atlanta Flames.

Playing career
Lalonde played in the 1962 Quebec International Pee-Wee Hockey Tournament with the LaSalle youth team. His junior career began with the Ontario Hockey Association's Montreal Junior Canadiens, for whom he played from 1968 to 1971, earning 255 points in combined goals and assists. The Junior Canadiens won the Memorial Cup twice during Lalonde's tenure there, once in 1969 and again the following year.

Lalonde turned pro in 1971, joining the National Hockey League's Vancouver Canucks as their number two draft choice. He netted 1 goal and 5 assists in 27 games with the Canucks prior to being sent to their American Hockey League affiliate Rochester Americans for the remainder of the season. Lalonde skated with the Americans for 42 games, tallying 25 points in goals and assists. The following season Lalonde skated with the Canucks, where he remained until 1977. He spent nearly half of the 1973–74 season out of play due to an ankle injury. During the 1975–76 and 1976–77 seasons, Lalonde briefly played for the Central Hockey League's Tulsa Oilers. All told, Lalonde netted 189 points in combined goals and assists in 353 games with the Canucks.

In October 1977, Lalonde (then a free agent) was picked up by the Atlanta Flames. Lalonde remained with the Flames through 1979, scoring 38 goals and 56 assists in 154 games.

Lalonde was traded to the Boston Bruins in exchange for future considerations in October 1979. He found himself playing for Fred Creighton, who had coached him previously in Atlanta. He spent the bulk of the 1979–80 and 1980–81 seasons in Boston, tallying 14 goals and 37 assists in 133 games.

In October 1981, the Bruins bought out the remaining year of Lalonde's contract and released him as a free agent. Lalonde returned to the NHL on a minor-league contract with the Calgary Flames, playing 19 games with the CHL's Oklahoma City Stars and 1 game with the Flames. He then moved to the European leagues, playing 15 games with HC Davos of the Swiss National League A before retiring from professional hockey in 1982.

Career statistics

Regular season and playoffs

References

External links 

1951 births
Living people
Atlanta Flames players
Boston Bruins players
Calgary Flames players
Canadian ice hockey centres
HC Davos players
Montreal Junior Canadiens players
Oklahoma City Stars players
Quebecers of French descent
Rochester Americans players
Tulsa Oilers (1964–1984) players
Vancouver Canucks draft picks
Vancouver Canucks players
Ice hockey people from Montreal
Canadian expatriate ice hockey players in Switzerland
Canadian expatriate ice hockey players in the United States